Dowell is a surname. Notable people with the surname include:

Alastair Dowell (1920–2010), Scottish cricketer
Anthony Dowell (born 1943), English ballet dancer
Brenna Dowell (born 1996), American artistic gymnast
Cassius C. Dowell (1864–1940), Republican U.S. Representative from Iowa
Charlie Dowell (1888–?), Australian football player
Coleman Dowell (1925–1985), American songwriter and author
David Dowell, American atmospheric scientist
Denzel Dowell (1944–1967), African-American killed by a police officer
Dion Dowell (born 1985), American basketball player
Duck Dowell (1912–2003), American basketball player
Edward Dowell (1822–1896), English cricketer and clergyman
Frances O'Roark Dowell (born 1964), American author
George Dare Dowell (1831–1910), English Victoria Cross recipient
Hanson Dowell (1906–2000), Canadian ice hockey administrator and politician
Jake Dowell (born 1985), American ice hockey player
Joe Dowell (1940–2016), American pop singer
John Dowell (born 1935), British physicist
John E. Dowell Jr. (born 1941), American printmaker and professor
Ken Dowell (born 1961), American baseball player
Kieran Dowell (born 1997), English football player
Leonard Dowell (born 1902), Scottish football player
Pat Dowell  (born 1957), American alderman
Roy Dowell (born 1951), California artist
Saxie Dowell (1904–1974), American jazz and pop bandleader
Spright Dowell (1878–1963), President of Alabama Polytechnic Institute, now Auburn University
Stephen Dowell (1833–1898), English historian and legal writer
Susanne Irene Dowell (born 1941), American mezzo-soprano
Wayne Dowell (born 1978), English football player
William Dowell (1885–1949), Welsh rugby player

See also
Dowall
William Dowel (1837–1905) Australian politician
Mike MacDowel (born 1932) British racecar driver
MacDowell (disambiguation)
McDowell (surname)

Surnames of English origin